Vilaiyattu Bommai is a 1954 Indian Tamil language film directed by T. R. Raghunath. The film stars T. R. Mahalingam and Kumari Kamala.

Cast & Crew
The following lists of cast and crew were compiled from Film News Anandan's database.

Cast

T. R. Mahalingam
Kumari Kamala
K. Sarangapani
B. R. Panthulu
Baby Radha (Kumari Kamala's sister)
V. K. Ramasamy
E. V. Saroja
K. A. Thangavelu
Lakshmiprabha

Crew
Producer: T. R. Mahalingam
Director: T. R. Raghunath
Dialogues: A. L. Narayanan
Cinematography: R. Sampath
Editing: Devarajan
Art: Vardhukar
Lab: Tamil Nadu Cine Lab

Production
Naam Iruvar was a successful film for T. R. Mahalingam. Sukumar was the name of his role in this film. He considered it to be a lucky name and named his son as Sukumar. In 1950, he launched a company Sri Sukumar Productions and produced a film titled Macha Regai. It was a failure. He produced Mohana Sundaram in 1951 that fared not so bad in the box-office. In 1952 he produced Chinna Durai that he himself directed. Again, it was a failure. All these 3 films had almost the same cast. T. R. Mahalingam was determined to produce a successful film. So he produced this film (Vilaiyattu Pillai was the original name) Vilaiyattu Bommai. He changed the cast and made the experienced T. R. Raghunath as director. However, this film also was a failure. After this, he started production of another film titled Theru Padagan and abandoned it half way. He lost all his wealth and became insolvent.
Though the films failed in box-office, most of the songs became popular.

Soundtrack
Music was composed by T. G. Lingappa while the lyrics were penned by Subramania Bharati, K. P. Kamatchisundaram and Thanjai Ramaiah Dass. Singer is T. R. Mahalingam. Playback singers are A. P. Komala, Soolamangalam Rajalakshmi and Jikki.

References

External links

Indian drama films
1950s Tamil-language films
Films scored by T. G. Lingappa
Films directed by T. R. Raghunath
1954 drama films
1954 films